Paschoal Silva (24 May 1900 – 23 December 1987) was a Brazilian footballer. He played in six matches for the Brazil national football team in 1923. He was also part of Brazil's squad for the 1923 South American Championship.

References

External links
 

1900 births
1987 deaths
Brazilian footballers
Brazil international footballers
Place of birth missing
Association football forwards
CR Vasco da Gama players